Albert Dennis Clark (July 2, 1910 – March 12, 1988) was an American Negro league outfielder in the 1930s.

A native of Fayette, Mississippi, Clark played for the Chicago American Giants in 1930. He died in Baton Rouge, Louisiana in 1988 at age 77.

References

External links
 and Seamheads

1910 births
1988 deaths
Chicago American Giants players
20th-century African-American sportspeople
People from Fayette, Mississippi